Lake Oswego is a city in the U.S. state of Oregon, primarily in Clackamas County, with small portions extending into neighboring Multnomah and Washington counties. The city was the hub of Oregon's brief iron industry in the late 19th century, and is today a suburb of Portland. The population in 2010 was 36,619, a 3.8% increase over the 2000 population of 35,278.

History

Early history
The Clackamas people once occupied the land that later became Lake Oswego, but diseases transmitted by European explorers and traders killed most of the natives. Before the influx of non-native people via the Oregon Trail, the area between the Willamette River and Tualatin River had a scattering of early pioneer homesteads and farms.

19th century

As settlers arrived, encouraged by the Donation Land Claim Act of 1850 and the subsequent Homestead Act, they found the land underoccupied.

Albert Alonzo Durham founded the town of Oswego in 1847, naming it after Oswego, New York. He built a sawmill on Sucker Creek (now Oswego Creek), the town's first industry.

In 1855, the federal government forcibly relocated the remaining Clackamas people to the Grand Ronde Indian Reservation in nearby Yamhill County.

During this early period in Oregon history, most trade proceeded from Portland to Oregon City via the Willamette River, and up the Tualatin River valley through Tualatin, Scholls, and Hillsboro. The thick woods and rain-muddied roads were major obstacles to traveling by land. The vestiges of river landings, ferry stops, and covered bridges of this period can still be seen along this area. A landing in the city's present-day George Rogers Park is thought to have been developed by Durham around 1850 for lumber transport; another landing was near the Tryon Creek outlet into the Willamette.

In 1865, prompted by the earlier discovery of iron ore in the Tualatin Valley, the Oregon Iron Company was incorporated. Within two years, the first blast furnace on the West Coast was built, patterned after the arched furnaces common in northwestern Connecticut, and the company set out to make Oswego into the "Pittsburgh of the West". In 1878, the company was sold off to out-of-state owners and renamed the Oswego Iron Company, and in 1882, Portland financiers Simeon Gannett Reed and Henry Villard purchased the business and renamed it the Oregon Iron and Steel Company.

The railroad arrived in Oswego in 1886, in the form of the Portland and Willamette Valley Railway. A  line provided Oswego with a direct link to Portland. Prior to this, access to the town was limited to primitive roads and riverboats. The railroad's arrival was a mixed blessing; locally, it promoted residential development along its path, which enabled Oswego to grow beyond its industrial roots, but nationally, the continued expansion of the freight railroad system gave easy local access to cheaper and higher quality iron from the Great Lakes region. This ultimately led to the local industry's demise.

By 1890, the industry produced 12,305 tons of pig iron, and at its peak provided employment to around 300 men. The success of this industry greatly stimulated the development of Oswego, which by this time had four general stores, a bank, two barber shops, two hotels, three churches, nine saloons, a drugstore, and even an opera house.

The iron industry was a vital part of a strategy designed by a few Portland financiers who strove to control all related entrepreneurial ventures in the late 19th century. Control of shipping and railroads was held under the Oregon Steam Navigation Company, later to become the Oregon Railway and Navigation Company. This local monopoly responded to the area's increasing demand for iron and steel, and grew to play a key role in economic history throughout the area.

20th and 21st centuries

With the water needs of the smelters tailing off, the recreational potential of the lake and town was freed to develop rapidly.

In 1910, the town of Oswego was incorporated. The Southern Pacific Railroad, which had acquired the P&WVR line at the end of the 19th century, widened it from narrow to standard gauge and in 1914 electrified it, providing rapid, clean, and quiet service between Oswego and Portland. The service was known as the Red Electric.

Passenger traffic hit its peak in 1920 with 64 trains to and from Portland daily. Within nine years of the peak, passenger service ended, and the line was used for intermittent freight service to  Portland's south waterfront until its abandonment in 1984. The line was preserved, however, and the Willamette Shore Trolley provides tourist rides on the line today.

One of the land developers benefiting from sales by OI&S was Paul Murphy, whose Oswego Lake Country Club helped promote the new city as a place to "live where you play." Murphy was instrumental in developing the first water system to supply the western reaches of the city, and also played a key role in encouraging the design of fine homes in the 1930s and 1940s that ultimately established Oswego as an attractive place to live. In the 1940s and 1950s, continued development helped spread Oswego's residential areas.

Mass transit service after the end of electric interurban service was provided by Oregon Motor Stages, but that company suspended all operations following a drivers' strike in 1954. In 1955, a newly formed private company, Intercity Buses, Inc., began operating bus service connecting Oswego with downtown Portland and Oregon City. This service was taken over by TriMet in 1970.

In 1960, Oswego was renamed "Lake Oswego" when it annexed part of neighboring Lake Grove. The city has some nicknames including "Lake No-Negro", "Lake Big Ego", "Fake Oswego" and "Fake Lost Ego". Additionally, it was spoken of as Nimbyville during a planning-related seminar on 2008 by Dennis Egner. A 2012 article in the Daily Journal of Commerce identified Egner as a long-range planning director for the city of Lake Oswego. According to historian James W. Loewen, locals often call it "Lake No Negro" in reference to its recognition status as an "elite white suburb".

In August 2020, Lake Oswego received significant media attention when its resident received an anonymous letter from neighbors asking them to take down their "Black Lives Matter" sign from the window, complaining that it lowers property values, which prompted Mayor Studebaker to issue a response to this matter. A documentary titled Lake No Negro about Lake Oswego's racially exclusive past was produced by a Lakeridge High School student in 2020<ref>{{Cite news |last=Zeller |first=Asia |date=May 21, 2020 |title=Behind the documentary 'Lake 'No Negro |work=LakeOswegoReview |url=https://pamplinmedia.com/lor/108-education/467711-378701-behind-the-documentary-lake-no-negro |url-access=subscription |access-date=July 29, 2022}}</ref>

Geography
Oswego Lake is a lake, originally named Waluga (wild swan) by Clackamas Indians, which has been expanded is and currently managed by the Lake Oswego Corporation. The lake supports watercraft, and a dock floats at the lake's east end, where boaters can disembark and walk to the nearby businesses. The main canal from the Tualatin River was dug in 1872.

Every three years, the water level in the lake is lowered several feet by opening the gates on the dam and allowing water to flow into Oswego Creek and on to the Willamette River, enabling lakefront property owners to conduct repairs on docks and boathouses.

The city extends up Mount Sylvania and through Lake Grove towards Tualatin.

Demographics

2010 census
As of the census of 2010, there were 36,619 people, 15,893 households, and 10,079 families residing in the city. The racial makeup of the city was 89.3% White, 0.7% African American, 0.4% Native American, 5.6% Asian, 1.0% from other races, and 3.0% from two or more races. Hispanics or Latinos of any race were 3.7% of the population.

Of the 15,893 households, 28.9% had children under the age of 18 living with them, 53.1% were married couples living together, 7.4% had a female householder with no husband present, 2.9% had a male householder with no wife present, and 36.6% were not families. About 30.1% of all households were made up of individuals, and 11.8% had someone living alone who was 65 years of age or older. The average household size was 2.29 and the average family size was 2.88.

The median age in the city was 45.8 years; 22.1% of residents were under the age of 18; 5.7% were between the ages of 18 and 24; 21% were from 25 to 44; 35.1% were from 45 to 64; and 16.2% were 65 years of age or older. The gender makeup of the city was 47.3% male and 52.7% female.

In the city, the population was distributed as 24.8% under the age of 18, 6.1% from 18 to 24, 26.8% from 25 to 44, 31.0% from 45 to 64, and 11.4% who were 65 years of age or older. The median age was 41 years. For every 100 females, there were 92.9 males. For every 100 females age 18 and over, there were 88.2 males. The median income for a household in the city was $71,597, and for a family was $94,587 ( Males had a median income of $66,380 versus $41,038 for females. The per capita income for the city was $42,166, and 3.4% of the population and 2.3% of families were below the poverty line. Of the total population, 2.0% of those under the age of 18 and 4.0% of those 65 and older were living below the poverty line.

City government

The city has a council-manager form of government, which vests policy-making authority in an elected, volunteer city council. The council consists of a mayor and six councilors, all of whom are elected at-large and serve four-year terms.

Day-to-day operations are handled by an appointed, professional city manager. Almost all of the city's employees, which include part-time staff amounting to about 342 full-time equivalents, report to the city manager. This includes the police chief, fire chief, one assistant city manager, and the community development director. The biggest groups are:
Police and fire departments, consisting of about 50 people each,
Library, parks, and recreation departments, consisting of about 70 people total
About 80 people throughout the engineering, planning, and maintenance departments

Ground was broken in 2019 on construction of a new city hall that would also house the city's police department and the Arts Council of Lake Oswego, on a site adjacent to the existing facility. Located at A Avenue and Third Street, the new city hall opened to the public in April 2021.

Civic involvement
Neighborhood associations play a formal role for citizen involvement in the city government's land-use planning and other activities. A neighborhood association's role is governed by state and city law. As of September 2013, the 21 recognized neighborhood associations (associations including lakefront property are marked with a ¤ symbol) include: Birdshill, Blue Heron ¤, Bryant ¤, North Shore-Country Club ¤, Evergreen ¤, First Addition, Forest Highlands, Glenmorrie, Hallinan Heights, Holly Orchard, Lake Grove, Lakewood ¤, McVey-South Shore ¤, Old Town, Palisades ¤,  Rosewood, Skylands, Uplands, Waluga, Westlake, and Westridge.

 Oswego Lake 

Oswego Lake has been a subject of controversy over whether it is a private lake or a public navigable water. A lawsuit against the city charges that they are preventing people from using a public stairway in a public park to swim in a public lake. The City of Lake Oswego does not allow public access. Two recreational users of the lake who were barred from using the lake filed a lawsuit in 2012. On August 1, 2019, the Oregon Supreme Court ruled that a 2012 Lake Oswego ordinance will need to be reviewed. The Supreme Court recognized public right to enter the body of water from public land and that the City of Lake Oswego cannot interfere with this right.

Public schools

The Lake Oswego School District is within the city boundaries and serves the city's roughly 7,000 students, with a ratio of 23 students per instructor. The two high schools in the district are Lake Oswego High School and Lakeridge High School. The six elementary schools and two junior high schools serve students in grades 1 through 8. The junior high schools are Lakeridge Junior High and Lake Oswego Junior High. Lakeridge Junior High was known as Waluga Junior High until 2012 when it was merged with Bryant Elementary.

Cultural and recreational facilities
The city maintains  of parks and open spaces including George Rogers Park and Millennium Plaza Park.

Lake Oswego has one public library, part of the Library Information Network of Clackamas County. From 2002 to 2006, the library was rated among the top 10 libraries serving similar population sizes in the United States.

Economy
Largest employers
According to Lake Oswego's 2018 Comprehensive Annual Financial Report, the principal employers in the city are:

Notable people

 LaMarcus Aldridge (1985– ), former NBA player for the Portland Trail Blazers
 Art Alexakis (1962– ), founder and lead singer of multiplatinum band Everclear
 Allen Alley (1954– ), Republican nominee for Oregon state treasurer in 2008, Republican candidate for Oregon governor in 2010
 Jon Arnett, NFL player and member of the College Football Hall of Fame
 Luke Askew (1932–2012), actor.
 Daniel Baldwin (1960– ), film actor, producer, and director
 Nicolas Batum (1988– ), player for the Los Angeles Clippers
 J. J. Birden (1965– ), NFL wide receiver
 Frank Brickowski (1959– ), NBA player
 Walter F. Brown (1926– ), Navy commander JAGC, judge, state senator, 2004 presidential candidate for the Socialist Party USA
 Terry Dischinger (1940– ), basketball gold medalist in the 1960 Olympics and NBA player from 1962 to 1973
 Mike Dunleavy, Jr. (1980– ), Former NBA player
 Mike Erickson (1963– ), businessman and candidate for U.S. Congress in 2006 and 2008
 Rudy Fernández (1985– ), NBA player for the Portland Trail Blazers (2008–2011)
 Stu Inman (1926–2007), co-founder of the Portland Trail Blazers
 Neil Lomax (1959– ), NFL quarterback 1981–88
 Lopez Lomong (1983– ), U.S. Olympic Team track runner 2008 & 2012, and one of the Lost Boys of the Sudan
 Stan Love (1949– ),  player 1971–1975 and father of Kevin Love
 Merrill A. McPeak (1936– ), former USAF chief of staff
 Linus Pauling (1901–1994), winner of two Nobel prizes, in peace and chemistry; author and educator (Ancestors of Pauling moved to Oswego in 1882.)
 Julianne Phillips (1960– ), model, actress, former wife of Bruce Springsteen, co-star of 1990s TV series Sisters Henry Selick (1952– ), stop-motion director and animator: The Nightmare Before Christmas, Coraline''
 William Stafford (1914–1993), U.S. Poet Laureate 1970–71
 Drew Stanton (1984– ), NFL quarterback for the Arizona Cardinals
 Salim Stoudamire (1982– ), professional basketball player
 Michael Stutes (1986– ), MLB relief pitcher for the Philadelphia Phillies
 Nathan Farragut Twining (1897–1982), chairman of the United States Joint Chiefs of Staff, 1957–1960
 Yeat (2000– ), rapper

Sister cities
Lake Oswego has two sister cities:

 Yoshikawa, Saitama, Japan
  Pucón, Araucanía Region, Chile

See also 

 Willamette Shore Trolley

References

External links

 
 Historic photos of Lake Oswego from the City of Lake Oswego
 Lake Oswego from the Oregon Blue Book
 

 
Cities in Oregon
Cities in Clackamas County, Oregon
Cities in Multnomah County, Oregon
Cities in Washington County, Oregon
Populated places established in 1847
1847 establishments in Oregon Country
1910 establishments in Oregon
Populated places established in 1910
Populated places on the Willamette River
Portland metropolitan area